Rudi Taeymans (born 8 February 1967 in Merksem) is a former Belgian football defender who played as left-back, mainly for R Antwerp FC.

Honours 
Royal Antwerp

 Belgian Cup: 1991-92
 UEFA Cup Winners' Cup: 1992-93 (runners-up)

References

External links
 
 Rudi Taeymans at rafcmuseum.be

Living people
1967 births
Belgian footballers
Association football defenders
Royal Antwerp F.C. players
K. Berchem Sport players
Royal Cappellen F.C. players
Belgian Pro League players
People from Merksem
Footballers from Antwerp